Millia is a feminine given name. Notable people with this name include:

Millia Davenport, American costumer and theater scholar
Millia Rage, fictional character in the Guilty Gear video game series

See also
 Millie (disambiguation)
 Milium (dermatology) (plural is milia)
 Jamia Millia Islamia, university in India

Feminine given names